Four Peaks Brewing Co. is an Arizona brewery that was founded by Andy Ingram, Jim Scussel, and Randy Schultz. The company had opened an additional facility nearby in Scottsdale, Arizona, however, it was closed during the Covid-19 pandemic. Another Tempe brewing site opened in the summer of 2012.

The original Tempe location has a small display of Minnesota Vikings and Elvis Presley paraphernalia. The brewing equipment is visible in the northern and western sections of this historical property. The building was built in 1892 as an ice plant. The current architecture dates back to 1927 when it was remodeled in a Mission Revival style. It served as a creamery until 1953.

Four Peaks announced on December 18, 2015 that it was acquired by AB InBev, a multinational beverage conglomerate.

Kilt Lifter
Kilt Lifter is the brewery's flagship ale. It is a Scottish-style ale that contains approximately 6.0% alcohol by volume.

Seasonal beers
The brewery features seasonal ales, including the Leroy Brown, Winter Wobbler and McCarthy Red and in celebration of Halloween, a Pumpkin Porter.

References

Further reading
Arizona Republic
Arizona Republic
Arizona Republic
Arizona Republic
Arizona Republic
Arizona Republic
Arizona Republic

External links 
Four Peaks Brewery Website
BeerMe.com
Tempe Historical Property

Beer brewing companies based in Arizona
Companies based in Tempe, Arizona
InBev brands